Gabriela Niculescu (born 7 June 1986) is a retired professional tennis player and former member of the Romania Fed Cup team. On July 4, 2005, she reached her highest WTA singles ranking of 376, and her best doubles ranking was 199 on February 20, 2006. 

In 2008 playing for the University of Southern California in doubles, teamed up with Amanda Fink, she won the 2008 Pac-10 Doubles Championship, won the ITA West Regional doubles title, and finished the season ranked No. 4 in the nation. 

She became a national platform tennis champion after retiring from professional tennis. She won titles in 2016, 2018 and 2019.

Personal life
She is the older sister of tennis player Monica Niculescu.

ITF finals

Singles (1–2)

Doubles (25-11)

References

External links
 
 
 

1986 births
Living people
Romanian female tennis players
USC Trojans women's tennis players